The 1955 Texas Western Miners football team was an American football team that represented Texas Western College (now known as University of Texas at El Paso) as a member of the Border Conference during the 1955 college football season. In its sixth season under head coach Mike Brumbelow, the team compiled a 6–2–2 record (3–2–1 against Border Conference opponents), finished fourth in the conference, and outscored all opponents by a total of 227 to 114.

Schedule

References

Texas Western
UTEP Miners football seasons
Texas Western Miners football